Charles Joseph Stewart (April 16, 1923 – October 17, 2016), was an actor who has appeared in film and television in such TV shows as Star Trek: The Original Series, Batman, Bewitched, The F.B.I., The Brady Bunch and Knots Landing, as well as films such as The War of the Worlds (1953), The Lineup (1958), The Hollywood Knights (1980) and Armageddon (1998). He was additionally a professional tennis player.

References

External links
 

1923 births
2016 deaths
American male film actors
American male television actors
20th-century American male actors
Place of birth missing